Angus Lyons (born 12 January 1996) is an Australian cyclist, who currently rides for UCI Continental team .

In 2019, Lyons won the first stage of the Tour of Indonesia, enabling him to also wear the leader's jersey. Lyons also won the mountains classification at both the Tour de Langkawi and the Tour de Tochigi.

Major results

2013
 7th Time trial, Oceania Junior Road Championships
2014
 3rd Time trial, National Junior Road Championships
2015
 Oceania Under-23 Road Championships
7th Time trial
8th Road race
2016
 6th Time trial, Oceania Under-23 Road Championships
2017
 5th Time trial, Oceania Under-23 Road Championships
2018
 6th Road race, Oceania Road Championships
 6th Overall Joe Martin Stage Race
1st  Young rider classification
 7th Gravel and Tar
2019
 1st  Mountains classification Tour de Langkawi
 1st  Mountains classification Tour de Tochigi
 2nd Overall Tour de Indonesia
1st Stage 1
 3rd Overall Tour de Filipinas
2021
 9th Time trial, National Road Championships

References

External links

1996 births
Living people
Australian male cyclists